Station Master is a 1988 Telugu-language comedy-drama film, produced by S. Ambarish under the R.J.R. Productions banner, presented by Rao Gopal Rao and directed by Kodi Rama Krishna. It stars Rajendra Prasad, Rajasekhar, Ashwini, Jeevitha Rajasekhar  and music composed by Chakravarthy. The film was recorded as a Super Hit at the box office.

Plot
The film begins on two blossom friends Rama Rao (Rajendra Prasad) & Chaitanya (Rajashekar) educated and unemployed guys. In the ongoing process of their job trails, they reach a railway station and acquainted with its Station Master (Rao Gopal Rao). In a small span of time, they get closer to him and his wife Lakshmi (Annapurna). Since the couple is childless, they adopt them. Meanwhile, the boys falls for two beautiful girls Pushpa (Jeevitha Rajashekar) & Rani (Ashwini) each of them with different mentalities. Time being, Chaitanya marries Pushpa & Rama Rao with Rani. Soon after, while struggling with life, it takes an unexpected turn for these four people. The rest of the story is how Station Master makes them overcome the consequences which culminate into happy.

Cast

Rajendra Prasad as Rama Rao
Rajasekhar as Chaitanya
Ashwini as Rani 
Jeevitha Rajasekhar as Pushpa
Rao Gopal Rao as Station Master
Suthi Veerabhadra Rao as Kurmavataram
Suthi Velu as Talupulu 
Rallapalli as Bhavavi Shankar Ramlohiya Tilak Hitler
Sakshi Ranga Rao as Manager Ranganayakulu
Mallikarjuna Rao as Menon
Chitti Babu as Gandabhirundam
Chidatala Appa Rao
Satti Babu
Juttu Narasimham as Rikshawala
Mithai Chitti
Gadiraju Subba Rao as Driver
Annapurna as Lakshmi
P.R.Varalakshmi as Pushpa's mother
Anitha as Doctor
Chandrika as Gabbala Subbamma
Y. Vijaya as Pollamma

Soundtrack

Music composed by Chakravarthy. Music released on AVM Audio Company.

References

External links
 

Films directed by Kodi Ramakrishna
Films scored by K. Chakravarthy
1980s Telugu-language films